Egypt competed at the 2014 Summer Youth Olympics, in Nanjing, China from 16 August to 28 August 2014.

Medalists
Medals awarded to participants of mixed-NOC (Combined) teams are represented in italics. These medals are not counted towards the individual NOC medal tally.

Archery

Egypt qualified a male and female archer from its performance at the African Continental Qualification Tournament.

Individual

Team

Athletics

Egypt qualified 11 athletes.

Qualification Legend: Q=Final A (medal); qB=Final B (non-medal); qC=Final C (non-medal); qD=Final D (non-medal); qE=Final E (non-medal)

Boys
Track & road events

Field Events

Girls
Track & road events

Field events

Badminton

Egypt qualified two athletes based on the 2 May 2014 BWF Junior World Rankings.

Singles

Doubles

Basketball

Egypt qualified a girls' team based on the 1 June 2014 FIBA 3x3 National Federation Rankings.

Skills Competition

Girls' Tournament

Roster
 Nouralla Abdelalim
 Nada Abdelhamid
 Raneem Elgedawy
 Sara Nady

Group stage

Knockout Stage

Cycling

Egypt qualified a boys' team based on its ranking issued by the UCI.

Team

Mixed Relay

Diving

Egypt qualified two quotas based on its performance at the Nanjing 2014 Diving Qualifying Event.

Equestrian

Egypt qualified a rider.

Fencing

Egypt qualified four athletes based on its performance at the 2014 FIE Cadet World Championships.

Boys

Girls

Mixed Team

Gymnastics

Artistic Gymnastics

Egypt qualified two athletes based on its performance at the 2014 African Artistic Gymnastics Championships.

Boys

Girls

Rhythmic Gymnastics

Egypt qualified one individual and one team based on its performance at the 2014 African Rhythmic Championships.

Individual

Team

Trampoline

Egypt qualified one athlete based on its performance at the 2014 African Trampoline Championships.

Notes: Q=Qualified to Final; R=Reserve

Handball

Egypt qualified one team based on its performance at the 2014 African Men's Youth Handball Championship.

Boys' tournament

Roster

 Ahmed Abdelaal
 Abdelhamid Abdelhamid
 Ahmed Abdelwahab
 Abdelrahman Abdou
 Omar Belal
 Mohamed Eltayar
 Hady Morsy
 Yehia Omar
 Shady Ramadan
 Aly Refaat
 Mohamed Saleh
 Ahmed Salem
 Youssef Shehab
 Omar Wafa

Group stage

Semifinals

Gold-medal match

Modern Pentathlon

Egypt qualified two athletes based on its performance at the African YOG Qualifiers.

Rowing

Egypt qualified two boats based on its performance at the African Qualification Regatta.

Qualification Legend: FA=Final A (medal); FB=Final B (non-medal); FC=Final C (non-medal); FD=Final D (non-medal); SA/B=Semifinals A/B; SC/D=Semifinals C/D; R=Repechage

Sailing

Egypt qualified one boat based on its performance at the Byte CII African Continental Qualifiers.

Shooting

Egypt qualified three shooters based on its performance at the 2014 African Shooting Championships.

Individual

Team

Swimming

Egypt qualified four swimmers.

Boys

Girls

Table Tennis

Egypt qualified two athletes based on its performance at the African Qualification Event.

Singles

Team

Qualification Legend: Q=Main Bracket (medal); qB=Consolation Bracket (non-medal)

Taekwondo

Egypt qualified four athletes based on its performance at the Taekwondo Qualification Tournament.

Boys

Girls

Tennis

Egypt qualified one athlete based on the 9 June 2014 ITF World Junior Rankings.

Singles

Doubles

Triathlon

Egypt qualified two athletes based on its performance at the 2014 African Youth Olympic Games Qualifier.

Individual

Relay

Weightlifting

Egypt qualified 2 quotas in the boys' events and 1 quota in the girls' events based on the team ranking after the 2013 Weightlifting Youth World Championships.

Boys

Girls

Wrestling

Egypt qualified five athletes based on its performance at the 2014 African Cadet Championships.

Boys

Girls

References

2014 in Egyptian sport
Nations at the 2014 Summer Youth Olympics
Egypt at the Youth Olympics